Muir of Ord railway station is a railway station on the Kyle of Lochalsh Line and the Far North Line, serving the village of Muir of Ord in the Highland council area of Scotland.

History 

The station building and platform canopy were erected in 1894. Passenger services on the branch ceased on 1 October 1951, but the branch remained open for freight until 13 June 1960. Muir of Ord station was closed in 1960 but reopened in 1976.

In November 2015, work commenced on a new A862 road bridge at the northern end of the station.

Facilities 
Both platforms have modern waiting shelters and benches, with step-free access. There is a car park and bike racks adjacent to platform 1, along with a help point near to the entrance from the car park. As there are no facilities to purchase tickets, passengers must buy one in advance, or from the guard on the train.

Platform layout 

Passenger volume 

The statistics cover twelve month periods that start in April.

Services 

As of the December 2021 timetable, on weekdays and Saturdays, the station sees 12 trains northbound (4 to Wick via Thurso, 4 to Kyle of Lochalsh, 1 to Dingwall, 1 to Invergordon, 1 to Ardgay and 1 to Tain), and 14 trains southbound to Inverness. On Sundays, the station sees 6 trains northbound (1 to Wick, 1 to Kyle of Lochalsh, 1 to Invergordon and 3 to Tain), and 6 trains southbound.

References

Bibliography 

 
 
 

Railway stations in Highland (council area)
Former Highland Railway stations
Railway stations in Great Britain opened in 1862
Railway stations in Great Britain closed in 1960
Railway stations in Great Britain opened in 1976
Reopened railway stations in Great Britain
Railway stations served by ScotRail
1862 establishments in Scotland